The sculpin snail, scientific name Stiobia nana, is a species of small freshwater snail with an operculum, an aquatic gastropod mollusk in the family Hydrobiidae. This species is endemic to the United States.

References

 2006 IUCN Red List of Threatened Species.   Downloaded on 7 August 2007.

Molluscs of the United States
Stiobia
Taxonomy articles created by Polbot